Andrew Tennant may refer to:
 Andrew Tennant (pastoralist) (1835–1913), Scottish-born Australian pastoralist, businessman and politician
 Andy Tennant (born 1955), film director
 Andy Tennant (cricketer) (born 1966), Scottish cricketer, former coach of the Scottish national side
 Andy Tennant (cyclist) (born 1987), English professional track and road racing cyclist